TSS Hibernia was a twin screw steamer passenger vessel operated by the London and North Western Railway from 1900 to 1914. She was renamed HMS Tara on requisition by the Admiralty in 1914, and sunk in action in November 1915.

History

She was built by William Denny and Brothers of Dumbarton for the London and North Western Railway in 1899 and introduced into service in early 1900. She arrived at Dublin in January 1900, and served in the waters between Dublin and Holyhead.

In 1914 she was requisitioned by the British Admiralty as an armed boarding steamer and renamed HMS Tara.

The U-boat saved Hibernias crew and handed them over to Senussi tribesmen as prisoners of war (POWs). On 14 March 1916 they were being held at Bir Hakeim along with the crew of HMT Moorina, a horse transport. They were rescued by the Duke of Westminster's armoured car brigade, part of the Western Frontier Force. The captain of Tara at this time was Capt. R. Gwatkin-Williams, R.N.

The story of Taras crew is told by Captain Gwatkin-Williams in his book Prisoners of the Red Desert, Being a Full and True History of the Men of the Tara. The POWs were not held in a traditional POW camp, but rather at a desert oasis guarded by a few Turks and Arabs. Although only loosely guarded their escape was prevented by the surrounding desert and their general lack of food and water. Near the end of their captivity, inspired by their hopeless situation, Captain Gwatkin-Williams did attempt escape. After walking through the desert for two days he blundered into an Arab camp while walking at night and was recaptured and returned to Bir Hakeim.

After accidentally finding a letter from Captain Gwatkin-Williams to a Turkish officer stating the desperation of the situation at Bir Hakeim, the Duke set off to find the POWs. Passing the 70 mile estimate and running low on fuel he kept going as long as there was any hope, finding the camp after traversing . Captain Gwatkin-Williams estimated the prisoners were only a few days from death due to starvation when the Duke of Westminster rescued them.

References

1899 ships
Passenger ships of the United Kingdom
Steamships of the United Kingdom
Ships built on the River Clyde
Ships of the London and North Western Railway
Maritime incidents in 1915
Armed boarding steamers of the Royal Navy
Ships sunk by German submarines in World War I
World War I shipwrecks in the Mediterranean Sea
Shipwrecks of Egypt